The Toorongo Falls Reserve protects two waterfalls on the Toorongo River and the Little Toorongo River in Gippsland, Victoria, Australia.

Flora and fauna

The Reserve is home to wet forest types, including mountain grey gum, mountain ash, manna gum, blackwood and Austral mulberry. A variety of ferns thrive in the damp conditions including the necklace fern, soft tree fern, and the long fork-fern.

Animals found in the reserve include common and mountain brushtail possum, ringtail possum, sugar glider, and a variety of bats. Red-bellied black snakes are commonly found during warmer periods.

Waterfalls

Walking tracks

The reserve contains two bush walking tracks, which total 2.22 kilometres, taking a loop around the two waterfalls, and allowing the visitors to take the wide range of native experiences the area has to offer.

History

The area was an original border of two Aboriginal tribes. Wurundjeri who were to the west, and part of the Kulin Nation and the Braiakaulung, part of the Gunai Nation, who lived off the river flats of the Latrobe Valley. There is still evidence of Aboriginal heritage today, with many culturally significant sites being situated in the reserve.

See also

 List of waterfalls of Victoria

References

Nature reserves in Victoria (Australia)